Shabanluy may refer to:
 Shabanluy-e Olya
 Shabanluy-e Sofla